The Shchugor is a right tributary to the Pechora in the Komi Republic, northwest Russia.

References

Rivers of the Komi Republic